Exercise Delawar was a joint military exercise conducted by the United States and Iran under the auspices of the Central Treaty Organization (CENTO). It took place in southwest Iran.

Some 6,800 American military personnel from three military branches took part in this war game, including 2,300 paratroopers. U.S. naval forces, as well as Marines were also deployed in the Persian Gulf and performed amphibious operations, supported by close-air-support of F-100s.

According to Čūbīn and Zabih, by this war game, Washington "partially reassured" Tehran of its continued interest in the region.

References

External links

1964 in Iran
1964 in the United States
Airborne operations
Military exercises involving Iran
Military exercises involving the United States
Iran–United States military relations